{{Infobox Laboratory
|name           = Real Colegio Complutense at Harvard University
|motto          = 
|image          = Logo RCC.png
|caption        =
|established    = 1990
|type           = Post-Doctoral Advanced Research Institute
|budget         = 
|debt           = 
|research_field = All areas of Science
|director       = Prof. José Manuel Martínez Sierra
|head           = 
|faculty        = 
|staff          = 
|students       = 
|undergrad      = 
|postgrad       = 
|doctoral       = 
|postdoc        =
|profess        = 
|alumni         = 
|city           = Cambridge, Massachusetts, 02138
|address        = 26 Trowbridge
|campus         = 
|free           = 
|affiliations   = Harvard UniversityComplutense UniversityComplutense UniversityUniversidad Politécnica de Madrid, Universidad Rey Juan CarlosUniversidad de Alcalá de HenaresUniversidad de Sevilla|operating_agency = 
|nobel_laureates = 
|website        = 
|logo           = 
|footnotes      = 
}}

The Real Colegio Complutense at Harvard University (Cambridge, Massachusetts), US: The RCC at Harvard is an academic institution aimed at providing intellectual exchange between Harvard and the Spanish Academia. It is located at 26 Trowbridge Street, Cambridge (MA).

 History 
The RCC was founded as a joint cooperative institution to foster intellectual and scientific interaction between Harvard University and the Universidad Complutense de Madrid, with the support of King Juan Carlos I, Queen Sofia of Spain and the Commonwealth of Massachusetts. It follows the tradition of the Royal Spanish College, founded in 1364 to host Spanish Visiting Scholars at the University of Bologna. 
In November 1990, the Dean of the Universidad Complutense de Madrid at the time and the then-president of Harvard, Derek Curtis Bok, signed an alliance to create the Real Colegio Complutense. The King of Spain inaugurated the building in 1993 and the agreement was extended in 2009. 
RCC is currently celebrating its 25th anniversary.

 Members 
The RCC accord is the only one of its sort ever to have been approved by Harvard. The institution is directed jointly by the President of Harvard and the Rector of Complutense University. The RCC academic and advisory councils include outstanding members from both universities.  
Recently, the RCC has incorporated three new Partner Universities, which are the Universidad Politécnica de Madrid, Universidad Rey Juan Carlos, Universidad de Alcalá de Henares and Universidad de Sevilla, each of them represented by official delegates.

The current director is Prof. José Manuel Martínez Sierra', Jean Monnet ad personam Professor for the Study of European Union Law and Government. He is Faculty Affiliated of the Minda de Gunzburg Center for European Studies at Harvard and Faculty Associate of the David Rockefeller Center for Latin American Studies. He is also a Member of the IGLP Advisory Council at Harvard Law School.

 Mission 
Every year, the RCC offers research grants to a select number of Spanish scholars who conduct their research at Harvard as visiting scholars. It also offers a number of graduate fellowships to Spanish students who attend the different graduate schools at Harvard. In addition to this, faculty and researchers from the partner universities and other affiliated centers are eligible to becomeRCC Fellows'', enjoying the same privileges as Harvard's non-tenured Faculty.

The RCC sponsors a number of research projects and programs that cross over different fields of study, including experimental and social sciences, architecture, health, engineering, education, communication and humanities. The relevance of RCC Fellows, Associates and Alumni/ae, as well as their partnerships with local scholars and the Faculty of Harvard University, allow these projects to generate international knowledge networks and to promote intellectual exchange in a multidisciplinary framework.

As part of this framework, the institution hosts academic lectures and scientific events for an open audience, including Harvard professors and students.

Collaborations 
The RCC has signed several agreements with Spanish and International Institutions to organize summer seminars and workshops at the center. These institutions include the ISDI (Instituto Superior para el Desarrollo de Internet), the Fundación Rafael del Pino, the Institute for Ethics in Communication and Organizations (IECO), the International Academic Program of the Universidad Autónoma de Madrid and the Centro de Investigaciones Sociológicas.

References

External links 

 RCC Website
 Harvard University
 Universidad Complutense de Madrid
 Universidad Politécnica de Madrid
 Universidad Rey Juan Carlos
 Universidad de Alcalá
 Universidad de Sevilla

Harvard University
Complutense University of Madrid